Ismaël N'Diaye (born 20 April 1982) is an Ivorian basketball player formerly at Florida International University in Miami. He is originally from Abidjan, Côte d'Ivoire. A 6-foot-5.5-inches and 190 lbs small forward, N'Diaye played one year of college basketball at the University of Miami before transferring to Los Angeles City College for one year and Florida International University for his final two years of eligibility.  His best season was the 2004-05 season at Florida International, in which he averaged 13.4 points per game for the Golden Panthers.

N'Diaye is a longtime member and captain of the Côte d'Ivoire national basketball team and helped the team to a surprise silver medal at the 2009 African Championship.  He also participated with the team at the 2007 FIBA Africa Championship.

References

1982 births
Living people
2010 FIBA World Championship players
Ivorian expatriate basketball people in the United States
FIU Panthers men's basketball players
Ivorian expatriates in the United States
Ivorian men's basketball players
Los Angeles City Cubs men's basketball players
Miami Hurricanes men's basketball players
Small forwards
Sportspeople from Abidjan
Vevey Riviera Basket players
Ivorian emigrants to the United States